Ali Azari (born 2 June 1985) is an Iranian football left midfielder of Damash Iranian F.C. He was a member of Iran national under-23 football team.

Club career

Club career statistics

 Assist Goals

External links
Profile at Iranproleague.net

1985 births
Living people
Iranian footballers
Steel Azin F.C. players
Damash Iranian players
Association football forwards